2021 Balochistan attacks may refer to:

2021 Chaman bombings
Machh attack
May 2021 Balochistan attacks; see Insurgency in Balochistan
Quetta Serena Hotel bombing
August 2021 Quetta bombing
August 2021 Balochistan attacks (disambiguation)